The Oceania Swimming Championships are currently held every 2 years, in even years. They are organized by the Oceania Swimming Association, and feature teams representing countries and islands from that region.

Locations

Championships records

See also
Pan Pacific Swimming Championships
Swimming at the Pacific Games
Swimming at the Commonwealth Games
List of swimming competitions

References

 
Swimming competitions in Oceania
Recurring sporting events established in 1993
Oceanian championships